The Opposite of Fate: A Book of Musings is a 2003 memoir by Amy Tan. It is a collection of essays about her life, family, and influences.

Reception
Publishers Weekly called it a "robust book" and wrote "this is a powerful collection that should enthrall readers of The Joy Luck Club and Tan's other novels." Kirkus wrote "her prose is thoughtful, never maudlin or self-pitying. Tan writes as easily and unpretentiously about herself as about others." and described it as "An examined life recalled with wisdom and grace."

Awards
 New York Times Notable Book
 Booklist Editors' Choice
 2004 Audie Award for Best Nonfiction, Abridged

References

External links
Library holdings of The Opposite of Fate

2003 non-fiction books
American memoirs
Works by Amy Tan
G. P. Putnam's Sons books